The Battle Cry of Peace is a 1915 American silent War film directed by Wilfrid North and J. Stuart Blackton, one of the founders of Vitagraph Company of America who also wrote the scenario. The film is based on the book Defenseless America, by Hudson Maxim, and was distributed by V-L-S-E, Incorporated. The film stars Charles Richman, L. Rogers Lytton, and James W. Morrison.

Alternate titles for this film were A Call to Arms and The Battle Cry of War. In the UK, the film was called An American Home. A sequel followed in 1917, Womanhood, the Glory of the Nation.

Plot
In a war-torn world, Enemy agents under the leadership of "Emanon" conspire with pacifists to keep the American defense appropriations down at a time when forces of the enemy are preparing to invade. The invasion comes, and New York, Washington, and other American cities are devastated and the enemies take over the country

Book version
In the same year, J. Stuart Blackton published the book version of The Battle Cry of Peace with pictures from the film version. The book has nothing to do with Defenseless America by Hudson Maxim.

Significance
Upon its release, the film generated a controversy rivaling that of The Birth of a Nation because it was considered to be militaristic propaganda. Producer Stuart Blackton believed that the US should join the Allies involved in World War I overseas, and that was why he made the film. Former President Theodore Roosevelt was one of the film's staunchest supporters, and he persuaded Gen. Leonard Wood to lend Blackton an entire regiment of Marines to use as extras.

Production
The film was released by VLSE Incorporated [A Blue Ribbon Feature] and premiered in New York on August 6, 1915, at the Vitagraph Theater (formerly the Criterion Theater). The film is also known under the title A Call to Arms Against War or The Battle Cry of War. The copyright, requested by The Vitagraph Co. of America, was registered on November 10, 1915, under number LP6935.

In the UK, the film was released as An American Home. In 1917, a sequel was made to Womanhood, the Glory of the Nation which was directed by William P. S. Earle alongside James Stuart Blackton. In Italy, it was initially censored in August 1916, but managed to obtain clearance for distribution in February 1917; it was distributed by the Lombard Monopoly.

In 1917, when the United States entered the war, the film was reissued in a modified version which was given the title The Battle Cry of War.

Cast
 Charles Richman – John Harrison
 L. Rogers Lytton – Mr. Emanon
 James W. Morrison – Charley Harrison
 Mary Maurice – Mrs. Harrison
 Louise Beaudet – Mrs. Vandergriff
 Harold Hubert – John Vandergriff
 Jack Crawford – Poet Scout
 Charles Kent – The Master
 Julia Swayne Gordon – Magdalen
 Belle Bruce – Alice Harrison
 Norma Talmadge – Virginia Vandergriff
 Lucille Hammill – Dorothy Vandergriff
 Evart Overton – Vandergriff's son
 George Stevens – Butler
 Thais Lawton – Columbia
 Lionel Braham – The War Monster
 William J. Ferguson – Abraham Lincoln
 Paul Scardon – Ulysses S. Grant
 Joseph Kilgour – George Washington

Status
The majority of the film is now considered lost. The Cinemateket-Svenska Filminstitutet possesses one reel. Fragments of footage of battle scenes survive and are housed at the George Eastman House.

See also
 Womanhood, the Glory of the Nation
 List of incomplete or partially lost films
 Invasion literature

References

External links
 
 
 Film poster

1915 films
1915 lost films
1915 war films
American black-and-white films
American silent feature films
American war films
Fictional depictions of Abraham Lincoln in film
Films based on non-fiction books
Films directed by J. Stuart Blackton
Lost American films
Lost war films
Vitagraph Studios films
American World War I films
1910s American films